For the aircraft see: Thulin A (aircraft)

Thulin A was an automobile made by Enoch Thulins Aeroplanfabrik between 1920 and 1925. They were manufactured in a Thulinfactory in Landskrona, Sweden.

Gallery 

Cars of Sweden

References